A Sustainable Population for a Dynamic Singapore: Population White Paper, or simply known as the Population White Paper (PWP), is a controversial white paper released by the government of Singapore in January 2013 that projects Singapore's population as 6.9 million by the year 2030.

Content
The PWP projects an increase of 1.6 million people from 2013, or an average of 100,000 more people in Singapore each year. The PWP argued that up to 30,000 new permanent residents and 25,000 naturalized citizens each year are needed to sustain Singapore's population due to the falling birth rates in Singapore.

It also justified immigration and presence of foreign workers as helping local businesses thrive and "create good jobs for Singaporeans".

The PWP also included additional measures to encourage marriage and increase the birth rate. The motion was passed in Parliament to endorse the PWP by 77 votes to 13 (the 13 opponents included all members of the opposition and three nominated MPs), albeit after amendments made to leave out "population policy" and add focus on infrastructure and transport development.

Political reactions
Several parties opposing the PWP have taken it to be a targeted increase of Singapore's population to 6.9 million. Citizens reacted to the PWP with shock and anger, and this has led to the largest public protest ever organized in Singapore's history. In an 8 February 2013 speech in support of the White Paper, Prime Minister Lee Hsien Loong said that he expected the 2030 population to be "significantly below" the 6.9 million figure, but that 6 million would not be enough, because of the declining birth rate and the needs of aging people.

Criticism
Many Singaporeans have attributed the government's population and immigration policy as the cause of overcrowding and falling reliability of its public transportation system, increasing property prices for housing, suppressed wage level, increased competition for jobs (especially for professionals, managers, executives and technicians) and education, increasing income inequality and other social problems. Academics have also criticized the PWP as being "overly mechanistic, economically simplistic and astonishingly sociologically and politically naive". The PWP became one of the largest political issues in the 2015 general elections.

See also
 Immigration to Singapore
 Demographics of Singapore

References

External links
 population.sg website
A Sustainable Population for a Dynamic Singapore: Population White Paper

Society of Singapore
 
Economy of Singapore
Demographics of Singapore
2013 in Singapore
2013 documents